The 1987 Campeonato Paulista da Primeira Divisão de Futebol Profissional was the 86th season of São Paulo's top professional football league. São Paulo won the championship by the 15th time.  Ponte Preta and Bandeirante were relegated.

Championship
The twenty teams of the championship would all play twice against each other, with the best teams of each half and the two overall best teams qualifying to the Semifinals, and the bottom two teams being relegated.

First phase

Semifinals

|}

Finals

|}

Top Scores

References

Campeonato Paulista seasons
Paulista